WTAZ-LP (98.3 FM, "Listener Supported Radio") was a radio station broadcasting a Variety music format. Formerly licensed to New Tazewell, Tennessee, United States, the station was owned by Claiborne Communications Inc.

WTAZ-LP's license was cancelled by the Federal Communications Commission on September 18, 2013, due to the station having been silent for more than twelve months.

References

External links
 
 
 

TAZ-LP
Claiborne County, Tennessee
Defunct radio stations in the United States
Radio stations disestablished in 2013
2013 disestablishments in Tennessee
TAZ-LP